Ronald Boyack (1906 – 11 December 1988) was a Trinidadian cricketer. He played in two first-class matches for Trinidad and Tobago in 1924/25.

See also
 List of Trinidadian representative cricketers

References

External links
 

1906 births
1988 deaths
Trinidad and Tobago cricketers